William Mayne, 1st Baron Newhaven PC (1722 – 28 May 1794), known as Sir William Mayne, Bt, between 1763 and 1776, was a British merchant and politician who sat in the House of Commons from 1774 to 1790.

Early life
Mayne was the eldest son of the second marriage of William Mayne, of Powis Logie, Clackmannanshire. He was employed in the family business of Mayne and Barn at Lisbon until 1757, when he returned to England. From 1757 to 1765, he was a  director of the Royal Exchange Insurance Company and was recorded as a merchant in trade directories until 1780. He married the Honourable Frances Allen, daughter of Joshua Allen, 2nd Viscount Allen, and heiress of her brother John Allen, 3rd Viscount Allen, on 15 July 1758. Through his marriage, he gained considerable estates in Ireland.

Political career
Mayne was eager to enter Parliament and stood at the 1761 British general election at Canterbury where he was defeated. He was, however, returned in 1761 to the Irish House of Commons for Carysfort, a seat he held until 1776. He was created a Baronet, of Marston Mortaine in the County of Bedford, in the Baronetage of Great Britain in 1763 and sworn of the Irish Privy Council in 1766. At the 1768 British general election he contested Malmesbury where he stood no chance against vested interests, after briefly considering Colchester.

By 1774 Mayne had acquired a seat at Gatton where he was returned and was also elected Member of Parliament for Canterbury, where he chose to sit. In 1776 he was elevated to the Peerage of Ireland as Baron Newhaven, of Carrick Mayne in the County of Dublin. He was defeated at Canterbury in the 1780 general election and returned himself and his brother Robert Mayne for Gatton instead. His brother died in 1782 and Mayne was returned Gatton for the last time in 1784. In 1786 he sold his property at Gatton and did not stand in 1790.

Later life and legacy
Lord Newhaven died in May 1794. He and his wife, Frances, had one son who died in infancy and so the baronetcy and barony became extinct. What is now the city of Berlin, New Hampshire, was originally granted as "Maynesborough" in honor of Mayne.

References

1722 births
1794 deaths
Barons in the Peerage of Ireland
Peers of Ireland created by George III
Members of the Privy Council of Ireland
Irish MPs 1761–1768
Irish MPs 1769–1776
Members of the Parliament of Great Britain for English constituencies
British MPs 1774–1780
British MPs 1780–1784
British MPs 1784–1790
Members of the Parliament of Ireland (pre-1801) for County Wicklow constituencies